In chemistry, phosphine-boranes are organophosphorus compounds with the formula R3−nHnPBH3.  They are Lewis acid-Lewis base adducts derived from organophosphines (PR3−nHn) and borane (BH3).  They are generally colorless or white solids.  Since these adducts are air-stable, they represent a protected form of the parent organophosphine.

Formation and decomplexation
Typically phosphine-boranes are produced by treating the parent phosphine with a source of borane:
PR3−nHn  +  BH3  →  R3−nHnPBH3
Because borane solutions are expensive or dangerous, the borane is often generated in situ, e.g., by oxidation of borohydride with iodine.

Deprotection to liberate the phosphine is often achieved by treatment with a tertiary amine:
R3−nHnPBH3  +  R'3N  →  R'3NBH3   +  R3−nHnP

See also
 Frustrated Lewis pair, where the borane is often tris(pentafluorophenyl)borane
 Ammonia borane, related to phosphine-borane but with ammonia or amines in place of organophosphines

References

Phosphorus(−III) compounds